Zombodze is a village in Shiselweni, Eswatini.  Its population as of the 2007 census was 16,067. 

Zombodze is a royal village; many Swazi royals are buried on the burial hill there. King Mswati III pronounced the village royal given the history behind the village.

References
Statoids.com, retrieved December 11, 2010

Populated places in Shiselweni Region